was a Nippon Professional Baseball player. After playing for the Ōsaka Tigers for two years, Betto played for the Mainichi Orions from 1950 to 1957. In his first season with the Orions, Betto won the NPB's first Pacific League MVP Award and helped lead the team to victory in the first Japan Series.

Cultural References 
A T-shirt featuring a cartoon image of Betto was worn by Jeff Bridges' characters in at least three films, including The Fisher King, Cold Feet, and The Big Lebowski.

References

External links

1920 births
1999 deaths
Baseball people from Hyōgo Prefecture
Japanese baseball players
Hanshin Tigers players
Mainichi Orions players
Nippon Professional Baseball MVP Award winners
Managers of baseball teams in Japan
Chiba Lotte Marines managers
Osaka Kintetsu Buffaloes managers
Hiroshima Toyo Carp managers
Yokohama DeNA BayStars managers
Japanese Baseball Hall of Fame inductees